Nanchuan is a district and former county of Chongqing, China, bordering Guizhou province to the south.

Administration

Climate

Transport
 Nanchuan–Fuling Railway

References

Districts of Chongqing